Melrose-Mindoro High School is a public high school located at N181 State Rd.108, Melrose, Wisconsin 54642-8284. The school is part of the Melrose-Mindoro Area School District. It is a rural district located in Southwestern Wisconsin, serving approximately 700 students. The district is located approximately 25–30 minutes from Black River Falls, Sparta, and La Crosse. 
The district mascot is the Mustang.

References

External links 

 

Educational institutions in the United States with year of establishment missing
Public high schools in Wisconsin
Schools in Jackson County, Wisconsin